Susan Kay Christensen (born April 27, 1962) is the chief justice of the Iowa Supreme Court.

Education

Christensen received an undergraduate degree in psychology from Judson University, where she was valedictorian and graduated with highest honors. She then received a Juris Doctor degree cum laude from Creighton University School of Law.

Legal career

She practiced law in Harlan, Iowa at the firm Larson, Childs, Hall & Christensen from 1991 to 2003, specializing in family law. She then worked as a sole practitioner specializing in family law from 2003 to 2007. She was also a prosecutor, working as an assistant county attorney for Shelby County from 1991 to 2007, for Harrison County from 1996 to 2007, and for Crawford County in 2007.

State court service

Christensen was an associate judge for the Iowa Fourth Judicial District from 2007 to 2015 then a district judge for the same district from 2015 until her appointment to the Iowa Supreme Court.

Appointment to Iowa Supreme Court

Christensen was one of three finalists sent to the Governor for consideration after the retirement of Bruce B. Zager. In August 2018 Governor Kim Reynolds appointed Christensen to the Iowa Supreme Court. On September 21, 2018, she was sworn into office. Christensen is Reynolds' first appointment to the Iowa Supreme Court. She became the first female since 2011 and the third female overall to join the court.

On February 24, 2020, she was selected to be the chief justice of the Iowa Supreme Court, following the death of Mark Cady.

Personal life

Christensen was born and raised in Harlan, Iowa. Her father was former justice Jerry L. Larson who served on the Iowa Supreme Court from 1978 to 2008. Her brother Jeffrey Larson is a judge of the Iowa Fourth Judicial District. She is a registered Republican.

References

External links
 
 Iowa Supreme Court profile

|-

1962 births
20th-century American lawyers
20th-century American women lawyers
21st-century American judges
21st-century American women judges
Chief Justices of the Iowa Supreme Court
Creighton University School of Law alumni
Iowa Republicans
Iowa state court judges
Justices of the Iowa Supreme Court
Judson University alumni
Living people
People from Harlan, Iowa
Women chief justices of state supreme courts in the United States